John Doyle was a professional announcer whose voice was most notably used by the National Institute of Standards and Technology on their radio clock WWV, a "time and temperature" voice for the Audichron Company, and others.

John Doyle was a veteran weathercaster for several television stations in the Atlanta metropolitan area, including WSB-TV 2, WAGA-TV 5, and WGCL-TV 46. His career started at WSB AM 750 in Atlanta, Georgia.

He retired from broadcasting.  In addition to periodic voice jobs, he worked part time as a court bailiff in Gwinnett County, Georgia.

John peacefully passed away on January 2, 2023. He was 80 years old.

References

External links
Biographical information about Doyle (Electronic Tele-Communications, Inc.)

1940s births
2023 deaths
Television personalities from Atlanta
Year of birth missing
Telephone voiceover talent
American radio personalities